This is a list of some of the major or minor characters that appear (or have appeared) on the soap opera As the World Turns.

A
 Karen Adams
 Doe Lang (1968–70)
 Registered nurse.

 Reg Addington 
 Mark Sullivan(2008–09)

 Bart Albertini
 Robert Turano (2007)

 Neal Keller Alcott
 Mary Kay Adams (1992–93)
 Sister to Royce Keller; half-sister of Lucinda Walsh. Formerly married to Michael Alcott.

 Greta Aldrin
 Joan Copeland (1982)
 Rosemary Murphy (1989)

 David Allen
 Chris Browning (1997–2000)
 Daniel Markel (1997–99)

 Josie Anderson
 Kristen Connolly (2008–09)

 Kirk Anderson
 Tom Wiggin (1988–98)
 Father of Linda Ann Anderson and Stephen Anderson. Married to Samantha Markham. Formerly married to Lenore Carpenter and Ellie Snyder.

 Samantha Anderson
 Brooke Alexander (1994–96)
 Sherri Alexander (1997–98)
 Half-sister of Lucinda Walsh.  Married to Kirk Anderson. Mother of Georgia Tucker.

 Stephen Anderson
 James Van Der Beek (1995)

 Garth Andrews
 Tade Reen (2000)

 Danielle Andropoulos
 Joshua Dalin (1983)
 Colleen Broomall (1983–89)
 Kristanna Loken (1994)
 Ashley Williams (1994–96)
 Deidre Skiles (2008–09)
 Daughter of Betsy Stewart and Steve Andropoulos.

 Elizabeth "Betsy" Stewart Andropoulos
 Lindsay Frost (1984–87)
 Meg Ryan (1982-1984)
 Jordan Baker (1994)

 Margaret Crawford Andropoulos
 Mary Linda Rapeleye (1980–85)
 Sister of Lyla Montgomery Peretti; ex-wife of Frank Andropoulos

 Nick Andropoulos
 Michael Forest (1980–82)
Deceased fourth husband of Kim Sullivan Hughes. Brother of Steve.

 Steve Andropoulos
 Frank Runyeon (1980–87)
Brother of Nick Andropoulos; ex-husband of Carol Stallings, Diana McColl, and Betsy Stewart. Father of Danielle Andropoulos.

 Steve Avery 
 Samuel Stricklen (2006)

 Dean Avian
 Donald Berman (1990)

 Ameera Ali Aziz
 Tala Ashe (2008)

B
 Cleo Babbitt
 Jennifer Landon (2007)
 Mentally unstable look-a-like of Gwen Norbeck.

 Corinne Bailey
 Pearl Bailey (1982)

 Grace Baker
 Selena Royle (1956–59)
 Frances Reid (1959–62)
 Murial Williams (1962–19??)
 Mother of Jeff Baker.

 Jeff Baker
 Mark Rydell (1956–62)
 Deceased. Penny Hughes' first (and second) husband.

 Ted Bancroft
 Richard Backus (1979)
 
 Natalie Bannon
 Judith Chapman (1975–78)
 Janet Zarish (1981)
 Second ex-wife of Tom Hughes.

 Hank Barton
 Peter Burnell (1969)
 
 Courtney Baxter
 Hayley Barr (1990–94)
 Sister of Sean Baxter. Dated Andy Dixon.

 Sean Baxter
 Burke Moses (1989–91)
 Mark Lewis (1992)
 Brother of Courtney Baxter.

 Suzanne Becker
 Betsy Palmer (1982)

 Tad Becker
 Tanner Cohen (2006)

 Marty Bendel
 Ed Moran (2004)

 Camille Bennett
 Lauren B. Martin (1997–2000)

 Ambrose Bingham
 William LeMassena (1985–92)
 Dillon Evans (1986)
 Dick Latessa (1993)

 Andrew Blackmoore
 Luther Creek (2004)

 Guido Boggia
 Aleksander Krupa (2001)
 Inspector.

 Russell Boyd
 Jay Bontatibus (1999)

 Gary Bradshaw
 Neal Bledsoe (2007)

 Franny Brennan
 Toni Darnay (1963–65)

 Joe Bruno
 Humbert Allen Astredo (1970)

 Susan Burke
 Connie Scott (1966)

 Etta Mae Burrell
 Elain R. Graham (1996–99)

C

 Alexander Cabot
 Paul Hecht (1992–95)

 Jesse Calhoun
 Thomas Sadoski (2007)

 Dr. Doug Campbell
 Denis Romer (1979)

 Marcia Campbell
 Cynthia Bostick (1979)

 Gabriel Caras
 Ben Levin (2010)

 Red Carter
 Arch Johnson (1984)

 Dr. Douglas Cassen
 Nat Polen (1956–67)

 Martin Chedwyn
 Simon Prebble (1996)

 Janet Ciccone
 Julie Pinson (2008–10)
 Had an affair with Brad Snyder as a teenager, producing daughter Liberty Ciccone. Formerly married to Jack Snyder; gave birth to Dusty Donovan's son Lorenzo.

 Liberty Ciccone 
 Meredith Hagner (2008–10) 
 Sarah Wilson (2010)
 Daughter of Janet Ciccone and Brad Snyder. Formerly involved with Parker Snyder.

 Teri Ciccone
 Vanessa Ray (2009–10)

 Arthur Claybourne
 Bill Tatum (1991–92)

 Derek Coburn
 Benton Greene (2008–09)

 Steve Colby
 Tim Hopper (2006)
 Judge.

 Louise Cole
 Mary K. Wells (1958)

 Dr. Tim Cole
 William Redfield (1958)

 Audrey Coleman 
 Lynn Herring (2009)
 Mother of Henry, Eve, and Maddie Coleman.

 Eve Coleman 
 Bonnie Root (2006)
 Sister of Henry and Maddie Coleman. Serial killer.

 Grant Coleman
 Konrad Mattaei (1973–74)
 James Douglas (1974–95)
 Former husband of Lisa Grimaldi and Joyce Hughes.

 Henry Coleman 
 Trent Dawson (1999–2010)
 Son of Audrey Coleman and James Stenbeck. Formerly married to Katie Peretti and Vienna Hyatt. Married to Barbara Ryan.

 Joyce Coleman
 Barbara Rodell (1973–79; 1980–81)
 Ex-wife of Grant Coleman and Donald Hughes. Mother of Teddy "Ryder" Hughes.

 Maddie Coleman 
 Alexandra Chando (2005–07; 2009–10)
 Kelli Barrett (2008–09)
 Younger sister of Henry and Eve Coleman. Dated Casey Hughes.

 Dorothy Connors
 Nancy Pinkerton 1983–84

 Regina Corrado
 Priscilla Lopez (2003)

 Zoe Crane
 Aisha Henderson (1996)

 Darryl Crawford
 Rex Smith (1990–92)
 Late husband of Frannie Hughes.  Widower of Carolyn Crawford.  Father of Dana Crawford.

 Doug Cummings
 John Wesley Shipp (1985–86)
 Obsessive fan of Kim Sullivan Hughes. Briefly engaged to Frannie Hughes.

 Molly Conlan 
 Lesli Kay (1997–2004, 2009–10)
 Christina Chambers (2004)

D
 Joe D'Angelo
 Tony Musante (2000–03)

 Rose D'Angelo
 Martha Byrne (2000–04; 2006)
Deceased daughter of Iva Snyder and Rod Landry.  Twin sister of Lily Walsh.  Mother of Jade Taylor.  Killed by Will Munson.

 Thelma Dailey
 Jenny O'Hara (1992–93)

 Heather Dalton
 Tonya Pinkins (1983–86)

 Walker Daniels
 Real Andrews (2003–04)

 Mick Dante 
 Tom Pelphrey (2009–10)
A medical researcher developing a youth serum who claims to be the deceased James Stenbeck.

 Chaz Dargote
 D. C. Benny (2006–07)

 Jack Davis
 Martin Sheen (1965–70)

 Kevin Davis
 Karl Girolamo (2005–09)

 L.J. McDermott
 Robert Hogan (1991–92)

 Rick Decker
 John James (2003–04; 2008)
Mentally unstable ex-husband of Dr. Susan Stewart.

 Pam Dennison
 Kate Hodge (2007)

 Jack Devere
 Darnell Williams (1994)

 Andy Dixon
 Jason Ferguson (1976–79)
 Robert Dwyer (1980)
 Alfe Smith (1982)
 Sean Anthony (1983–84)
 Scott DeFreitas (1985–95; 1997–2000)
Son of Kim Sullivan Hughes and John Dixon. Half-brother of Sabrina Hughes, Christopher Hughes, Margo Hughes, Duke Kramer, the late Johnny Dixon, and Matthew John Dixon. Ex-husband of Courtney Baxter. Father of Hope Dixon with Denise Maynard.

 Hope Dixon
 unknown actresses (1998-2001)

 Denise Dixon
 Cassandra Creech (1998–2001)

 Duke Kramer Dixon
Michael Louden (1988–90; 1993)

 John Dixon
 Larry Bryggman (1969–2004; 2010)

 Pilar Domingo
 Roselyn Sanchez (1996–97)
 Daniella Alonso (2004)

 Ariel Aldrin Donovan
 Judith Blazer (1982–85)

 Burke Donovan
 David Forsyth (1983)

 Dustin "Dusty" Donovan
 Brian Bloom (1983–88)
 Grayson McCouch (2003–08; 2008–10)

 Harvey Dugan
 George R. Sheffey (2005)

 Iris Dumbrowski
 Terri Garber (2005–08; 2010)

 Ada Dunne
 Portia Reiners (2006)

 Sofie Duran
 Justine Cotsonas (2007–08)

E
 Dave Eagan
 Ken Garito (1997)

 Jules Earling
 Stu Richel (2006)

 Marty Egan
 Don Scardino (1969–70)

 Nels Andersson Einar
 Perry Scott (1980–84)

 Helen Eldridge
 Anne Shropshire (1992)

 John Eldridge
 Michael Levin (1991–92)

 Scott Eldridge
 Joseph Breen (1992–93)
 Christopher Cass (1993)
 Doug Wert (1995–96)

 Bruce Elliott
 James Pritchett (1962)

 Hank Elliott
 Brian Starcher (1989–90)

 Linda Elliott
 Beverley Owen (1956)

 Brian Ellison
 Robert Hover (1975)

 Kate Emerson
 Rachael Kelly (1978–79)

 Rob Emerson 
 Don Money (2007)

 Claire English
 Anne Burr (1956–59)
 Gertrude Warner (1960)
 Nancy Wickwire (1960–64)
 Jone Allison (1964–65)
 Barbara Berjer (1965–71)

 Judy English
 Sibyl Collier (1966)

 Sierra Esteban
 Finn Carter (1985–88; 1990; 1991; 1994)
 Mary Beth Evans (2000–05; 2010)

 Kelly Evans
 Catherine Kellner (1987)

F
 Beau Farrell
 Neil Maffin (1988–89)

 Jim Fellows
 Jonathan Roumie (2007)

 Stu Ferguson
 Jamey Sheridan (1986)

 Annabelle Fettle
 Phyllis Somerville (2004)

 Zac Finn
 Nicholas Galbraith (2009)

 Zoe Finn
 Melinda Sullivan (2009)

 Ruby Fisk
 Diane Perell (2008)

 Adelaide Fitzgibbon
 Susan Brown (1988)
 Beverly Penberthy (1989)

 Kit Fowler
 Lauretta Vaughn (2007–08)

 Evan Frame
 Eric Scott Woods (1994–95)

 Sergio Francone
 Robert Montano (2006)

 Gabriel Frank
 Nicholas Coster (2000–01)

 Ruby Frank
 Guenia Lemos (2000–01)

 Roy Franklin
 Count Stovall (1986–89)

 Sarah Franklin
 Novella Nelson (1989)

 Simon Frasier
 Paul Leyden (2000–03; 2004; 2006–07; 2009–10)

 Carol Demming Frazier
 Rita McLaughlin-Walter (1970–81)

 Sara Fuller
 Gloria DeHaven (1966–67)

G
 Emerson Gallagher
 John Cunningham (1992–93)

 Eliot Gerard
 Ian Kahn (2007)

 Kevin Gibson
 Steven Weber (1985–86)

 Simon Gilbey
 Jerry Lacy (1971)

 Dr. Gordo
 Joe Holt (2003)

 Melinda Gray Spencer
 Ariana Munker (1978–80)

 Bernard Ignatius Grayson
 Brent Collins (1982–83)

 B.J. Green
 Brian Gaskill (2005)

 Dallas Griffin
 Duane McLaughlin (2006–07)
 Kenneth Franklin (2007)
 Wolé Parks (2007–08)

 Lamar Griffin
 Vince Williams (1989)
 Michael Genet (1992–93)
 Chris Walker (1995)

 Jessica Griffin
 Tamara Tunie (1987–95; 1999–2007; 2009)
 Joanna Rhinehart (1995–99)

 Damian Grimaldi, actor Jon Lindstrom was originally offered the role; he turned it down.
 Paolo Seganti (1993–97; 2001; 2006; 2009–10)

 Dante Grimaldi
 Luca Calvani (2001)

 Eduardo Grimaldi
 Nicolas Coster (1993–95)

 Lisa Grimaldi
 Eileen Fulton (1960–64; 1966–2010)
 Pamela King (1964)
 Lynn Rogers (1977–78)
 Betsy von Furstenberg (1983–84)
 Jane Powell (1991; 1993–94)
 Maeve McGuire (1992)
 Carmen Duncan (2004)

 Orlena Grimaldi
 Claire Bloom (1994–95)
 Lynn Milgrim (1995)

H
 Bennett Hadley
 Doug Haggins (1979)

 Cynthia Haines
 Charissa Chamorro (2009–10)

 Cynthia Haines
 Linda Dano (1981–82)

 Karen Haines
 Kate McNeil (1981–84)

 Meredith Halliday
 Nina Hart (1970–71)

 Jef Hamlin
 Christopher C. Fuller (1994–96)

 Rick Hamlin
 Robert Vaughn (1995)

 Alice Hammond
 Imogene Coca (1983)

 Ben Harris
 Peter Parros (1996–2005; 2009)

 Curtis Harris
 Chad Tucker (2000–02)
 Ernest Waddell (2003–05)

 Annie Hasbrook
 Hallee Hirsh (1996)

 Rosalind Hatchley
 Ina Balin (1986)

 Graham Hawkins
 Nick Ullett (1992–94)

 Pat Holland Dixon
 Melinda Peterson (1976–77)

 Brad Hollister
 Peter Brouwer (1980–81)

 Eric Hollister
 Peter Reckell (1980–82)

 Hayley Wilson Hollister
 Dana Delany (1981)

 Amanda Holmes
 Deborah Steinberg Soloman (1966–68; 1970)

 Ann Holmes
 Augusta Dabney (1966–67)

 Bill Holmes
 William Prince (1966–67)

 Casey Hughes
 Cruise Russo (1991–99)
 Joseph Cross (1999–2002)
 Ian Boyd (2004)
 Peter Vack (2004)
 Zach Roerig (2005–07)
 Billy Magnussen (2008–10)

 Christopher Hughes I
 Don MacLaughlin (1956–86)

 Christopher "Chris" Hughes II
 Adam Hirshan (1987–90)
 Evan  Ross Cannata (1990–91)
 Christian Siefert (1992–98)
 Ben Jorgenson (1999)
 Paul Korver (1999–2001)
 Alan White (2002)
 Bailey Chase (2003–05)
 Dylan Bruce (2007–08)
 Daniel Cosgrove (2010)

 Daniel Hughes
 Jared and Lindsey Baskin (1999–2001)
 Dylan Bluestone (2001–06)
 Kevin Csolak (2006)
 Sam Stone (2007–08)

 Donald "Don" Hughes
 Hal Studer (1956)
 Richard Holland (1956–62)
 James Noble (1962)
 Peter Brandon (1965–72)
 Martin West (1976–78)
 Conard Fowkes (1978–81; 1985–86; 1993; 1995)

 Edith Hughes
 Ruth Warrick (1956–60)

 Frances "Frannie" Hughes
 Kelly Campbell (1973)
 Maura Gilligan (1975–79)
 Tracy O'Neil (1980)
 Melaney Candel (1982)
 Helene Udy (1982–83)
 Terri VandenBosch (1983–84)
 Julianne Moore (1985–88, 2010)
 Mary Ellen Stuart (1989–92)
 Mary Kane (1991; temporary)

 John Hughes
 Laurence Hugo (1960s)

 Kim Sullivan Hughes
 Kathryn Hays (1972–2010)
 Patty McCormack (1975–76; temporary)

 Lien Hughes
 Ming-Na (1988–91)
 Lea Salonga (2001, 2003)

 Margo Hughes
 Margaret Colin (1981–83)
 Hillary B. Smith (1983–89)
 Ellen Dolan (1989–93; 1994–2010)
 Glynnis O'Connor (1993–94)

 Mary Ellison Hughes
 Kelly Wood (1975–80; 1993)

 Nancy Hughes
 Helen Wagner (1956–2010)
 Betty Runnell (1988–89)

 Penny Hughes
 Rosemary Prinz (1956–68, 1985–88, 1993, 1998, 2000–01)
 Phoebe Dorin (1971)

 Robert "Bob" Hughes
 Bobby Alford (1956–58)
 Ronnie Welch (1958–60)
 Don Hastings (1960–2010)

 Ryder Hughes
 Kerr Smith (1996–97)

 Sabrina Hughes
 Julianne Moore (1986–88)
 Claire Beckham (1990–92)

 Thomas "Tom" Hughes
 James Madden (1963)
 Jerry Schaffer (1964)
 Frankie Michaels (1965–66)
 Richard Thomas (1966–67)
 Paul O'Keefe (1967–68)
 Peter Link (1969)
 Peter Galman (1969–73)
 C. David Colson (1973–78)
 Tom Tammi (1979–80)
 Justin Deas (1980–84)
 Gregg Marx (1984–87)
 Scott Holmes (1987–2010)

 William "Pa" Hughes
 Will Lee (1956)
 Santos Ortega (1956–76)

 Aurora Hunter
 Karen Ziemba (2009)

 Lucy Hunter
 Linda Cook (1981)

 Hutch Hutchinson
 Judson Mills (1991–93)

 Woody Hutchinson
 Dan Ziskie (1991–93)

 Faux Hwa
 C. S. Lee (2005)

 Vienna Hyatt
 Ewa Da Cruz (2006–10)

I

J
 Mason Jarvis
 Forbes March (2009)

 Roland Jefferies
 Steve Cell (2002)

 Ava Jenkins
 Yancy Butler (2009)

 Bonnie Jenkins 
 Caroline Aimetti (1993–96)
 Chloe Morris (1996–99)
 Napiera Danielle (2001–04)
 Chauntee Schuler (2007–09)

 Isaac Jenkins
 Paul Taylor (1999–2003)

 Kira Johnson
 Lauryn Hill (1991)

 Denise Jones
 Holly Marie Combs (1991–94)

 T. Jones
 Wendy Jones (2010)

K
 Mark Kasnoff
 Alexander Walters (1995–97)

 Mike Kasnoff
 Shawn Christian (1994–97)
 Mark Collier (2002–07; 2009)
 Jon Prescott (2008)

 Nick Kasnoff
 Jordan Woolley (2005–06)

 Nora Kasnoff

 Sarah Kasnoff
 Lisa Lawrence (1996)

 Laurie Keaton
 Laurel Delmar (1978)

 Dr. Alex Keith
 Jon Cypher (1977–79)

 Royce Keller
 Terry Lester (1991–94)

 Eli King
 Marc Aden Gray (2005–06)

 Marie Kovac
 Mady Kaplan (1985)

 Duke Kramer
 Michael Louden (1989–91)

 Jerry Kramer
 Philip Kraus (1983)

 Joe Kravitz
 Abe Vigoda (1985)

 Dr. Ross Kreeger
 Damian Young (2006)

 Gavin Kruger
 Joris Stuyck (1990)
 Mark Tymchyshyn (1990–92)

 Deborah Kurley
 Julie Lancaster (1997)

 Adonis Kapsalis
 Rex (2007)

L
 Lincoln "Linc" Lafferty
 James Wlcek (1990–92)
 Lonnie McCullough (1993)

 Dana Lambert
 Louise Roberts (1991–92)

 Henry Lange
 James Rebhorn (1988–91)

 Corrine Lawrence
 Patricia Gage (1986–88)

 Bridget Lawson
 Haviland Morris (2010)

 Hayden Lawson
 Sami Gayle (2009–10)

 Sandy Lebo
 Lori Hammel (2008)

 Corinne Lee
 Elaina Erika Davis (2000)

 Thea Lena
 Eleni Kiamos (1984)

 Phillip Lester
 Evan Ferrante (1988)

 Mark Lewis
 Biff Warren (1977–78)

 Charlotte Lindsey
 Susan Pratt (1999)

 Julia Lindsey
 Annie Parisse (1998–2002)

 Brock Lombard
 Gregory Beecroft (1989–90)

 Phillip Lombard
 David Cryer (1985)
 Chicago Mafia boss.

 Cheri Love
 Robin Mattson (2007)

 James "Jim" Lowell Jr.
 Les Damon (1956–57)
 William Johnstone (1956–79)

 Tuan Ly
 Russell Wong (1988)

 Ann Lynch
 Kaija Matiss (2005–06)

 Tammy Lynn
 Beth Glover (1999)

 Louie Lyons
 Rick Zahn (2005)

M
 Ruth Mansfield
 Ann Flood (1992–93)

 Ralph Manzo
 Stuart Damon (2009–10)

 Samantha Markham
 Brooke Alexander (1994–96)
 Sherri Alexander (1997–99)

 Lydia Marlowe
 Zsa Zsa Gabor (1981)

 Miranda Marlowe
 Elaine Princi (1981–83)

 D. A. Dick Martin
 Joe Maross (1966)
 Edward Kemmer (1966–70, 1975–78)

 Otto Martin
 Allen Nourse (1966–68)

 Derek Mason
 Thomas Gibson (1988–89)

 Mitzi Matters
 Anne Sayre (2000–04)

 Janice Maxwell
 Holly Cate (1993–95)

 Noah Mayer
 Jake Silbermann (2007–10)
 Patrick Kernan Quinn (2009)

 Winston Mayer
 Daniel Hugh Kelly (2007–09)
 
 Denise Maynard
 Cassandra Creech (1998–2001)

 Dan McClosky
 Dan Frazer (1985–96)
 Police lieutenant.

 Lewis McCloud
 Marc Gomes (1997)
 Monti Sharp (1997–98)

 Brian McColl
 Robert Burton (1982)
 Frank Telfer (1982–84)
 Mark Pinter (1984–86; voice)

 Diana McColl
 Kim Johnston Ulrich (1983–85)
 
 Kirk McColl
 Christian LeBlanc (1983–85)
 
 Whitney McColl
 Robert Horton (1982–84)
 
 Larry J. McDermott
 Ed Fry (1990–95; 2009)
 Robert Hogan (1991–92)

 Ian McFarland
 Peter Simon (1979–80)
  
 Roy McGuire
 Konrad Matthaei (1966–68)

 Beatrice McKechnie
 Ashley Crow (1986–87)

 Duncan McKechnie
 Michael Swan (1986–95; 2001–02)
 
 Jake McKinnon
 Tom Eplin (1999–2002)

 Bridget McKinnon
 Megan Ferrara (2001–02)

 Michelle McKinnon
 Lauren Ferrara (2001–02)

 Alma Miller
 Joanna Roos (1960)
 Ethel Remey (1963–77)
 Dorothy Blackburn (1978)

 Eric Mitchell
 Farley Granger (1986–88)

 Ralph Mitchell
 Keith Charles (1977–79; 1988–94)

 Stan Mitchum
 Daniel Ahearn (2005)

 Bryant Montgomery
 Dennis Marotta (1987–90)
 Todd Rotondi (2000–01)

 Craig Montgomery
 Scott Bryce (1982–90; 1993–94; 2007–08)
 Hunt Block (2000–05)
 Jeffrey Meek (2006–07)
 Jon Lindstrom (2008–10)

 Johnny Montgomery
 Daniel Menake (2005–06)
 Bailey Harkins (2008–10)

 Lucy Montgomery
 Amanda Seyfried (2000–01)
 Peyton List (2001–05)
 Spencer Grammer (2006)
 Sarah Glendening (2008–10)

 Julia Morrisey Larrabee
 Sarah Brown (2004–05)

 Keith Morrisey
 Kin Shriner (2005–06)
 
 Adam Munson
 Philip Webster Smith IV (1988–89)
 Michael Zderko (1989–95)
 Harry Zittel (1996–98)
 Craig Lawlor (1998–2002)
 Matthew Morrison (2006)
 Matt Cavenaugh (2006–07)
 Tom Degnan (2009)
 
 Hal Munson
 Benjamin Hendrickson (1985–2006)
 John Hilner (1994–95)
 James Kiberd (2004)
 Randolph Mantooth (2004–05)

 Jennifer Munson
 Michelle Ann Nemeh (1990–91)
 Sara Garney (1992–93)
 Brianne Sassone (1993–95)
 Alexandra Herzog (1995–99)
 Kim Onasch (1999–2002)
 Jennifer Ferrin (2003–06)

 Parker Munson
 Justin Weiss (1999)
 Cole Kachelhoffer (1999–2004)
 Giovani Cimmino (2004–06)
 Mick Hazen (2006–10)

 Gwen Norbeck Munson
 Jennifer Landon (2005–08; 2010)

 Nikki Munson
 Jordana Brewster (1995–98)
 McKenzie Satterthwaite (2004)

 Will Munson
 John W. Pink, Jr. (1993–96)
 Bryon Abadrabo (1996–99)
 Brett Groneman (2000–04)
 Jesse Lee Soffer (2004–08, 2010)

N
 Luis Navarro
 Gilbert Cruz (1994)

 Blythe Nelson
 Shelley Conger (1990)

 Elroy Nevens
 Cliff Weissman (1992–93)

 Cole Norbeck
 Chris Heuisler (2007–08)

 Jim Norman
 James Broderick (1962)

 Brad Norris
 Marcus Diamond (1983)

O
 Matt O'Connor
 Eric William Morris (2008–09)

 Anne O'Donnell
 Alice Barrett (1999)

 Shannon O'Hara
 Margaret Reed (1985–90; 1994–95)
 
 Angus Oliver
 James Rebhorn (2010)

 Dr. Reid Oliver
 Eric Sheffer Stevens (2010)

 Celia Ortega
 Alyssa Diaz (2005)

 Rafael Ortega
 A.J. Lamas (2004–05)
 Michael Cardelle (2005)

 Charlotte Overton
 Julie Potter (1993–94)

P
 Karen Parker
 Leslie Denniston (1977–78)

 Gil Penn
 Van Hughes (2006–07)

 Casey Peretti
 Bill Shanks (1986–90)

 Katie Peretti
 Cori Ann Hansen (1989–94)
 Terri Colombino (1998–2010)

 Lyla Peretti
 Veleka Gray (1980)
 Anne Sward (1980–93)
 Lee Bryant (1985; temporary)

 Neil Perkins
 Michael Izquierdo (2008)

 Anthony Peterson
 Brad Schmidt (2002)

 Steve Phillips
 Patrick Boll (2006)
 
 Delores Pierce
 Valerie Perrine (1998–99)

 Hester Pierce
 Ann Stanchfield (1979)

 Jamie Platt
 David Norton (1978–79)

 Tom Pope
 Charles Baxter (1957–58)

 Edith Prisk
 Ronnie Farer (2007)

 Tony Pugliese
 Nick Adams (2010)

Q
 Peter Quinn
 Danny Johnson (2006)

R
 Reenie
 Amy Ryan (1990)

 Richie
 Gerald Anthony (2003)

 Roseanne
 Edie Adams (1982)

 Sergei Radzinsky
 Jonathan Sharp (1991)

 Dominic Ramsey
 Chris Tardio (2004)

 Joe Ramirez
 Gary Perez (1995–2002)
 Police detective.

 Greg Ray
 Nicholas Cortland (1985)

 Coleman "Doc" Reese
 D.J. Lockhart-Johnson (2004)

 Rita Renfield
 Barbara Garrick (1998–99)

 Tonio Reyes
 Peter Boynton (1986–91; 1992)

 Ann Reynolds
 Linda Cook (2007)

 Casey Reynolds
 Nicolette Goulet (1984)

 Valerie Reynolds
 Judith McConnell (1976–79)

 Harold Rice
 Peter McRobbie (2008)
 Judge.

 Lauren Roberts
 Celeste Holm (1981)

 Bethany Rose
 Tovah Feldshuh (1994)
 
 Cricket Montgomery Ross
 Lisa Loring (1980–84)

 Ernest "Ernie" Ross
 Marshall Watson (1982–83)

 William "Billy" Ross
 Hunter Garner (2001–02)

 Barbara Rusk
 Lara Hillier (2009)

 Barbara Ryan
 Judi Rolin (Early 1970s)
 Barbara Stranger (Early 1970s)
 Donna Wandry (1971–72)
 Colleen Zenk (1978–2010)

 Paul Ryan
 Danny Pintauro (1983–84)
 Elden Ratliff (1984–85)
 C.B. Barnes (1985–86)
 Damon Scheller (1986)
 Andrew Kavovit (1986–91)
 John Howard (1996)
 Scott Holroyd (2001–03)
 Roger Howarth (2003–10)

 Rosanna Ryan
 Yvonne Perry (1992–99)
 Cady McClain (2002–05, 2007–10)
Daughter of Alexander Cabot. Half-sister of Carly Tenney Snyder. Twice married and divorced Craig Montgomery and Paul Ryan. Widow of the late Jordan Sinclair.  Illegal adopted mother of Cabot Sinclair.

 Rick Ryan
 Con Roche (1972–73, 1986–87)
 Gary Hudson (1981)

S
 Diego Santana
 Bronson Pickett (1996–97)

 Elaine Schiller
 Traci Godfrey (2005–08)

 Nicholas Scudder
 Carl T. Evans (2001–02)

 Dr. Michael Shea
 Jay Lanin (1966–68)
 Roy Shuman (1968–70)

 Tess Shelby
 Parker Posey (1991–92)

 Eddie Silva
 Nathaniel Marston (1998–2000)
 Frank J. Galasso (1998, flashback)

 Debbie Simon
 Sharon Case (1992–93)

 Ned Simon
 Frank Converse (1992–94)

 Bud Simpson
 Vasili Bogazianos (2004)

 Jordan Sinclair
 Chris Beetem (2004–05)

 Ike Slattery
 William Hickey (1983)

 Aaron Snyder
 Mason Boccardo (1991–95)
 Unknown actor (1998)
 Agim Kaba (2002–05, 2007–09)

 Angel Snyder
 Alice Haining (1988–94)

 Brad Snyder
 Nick Kokotakis (1998–99)
 Roy Eudon (1999)
 John Loprieno (1999)
 Austin Peck (2007–09)

 Caleb Snyder
 Michael David Morrison (1988–93)
 Graham Winton (1989 [temporarily]; 1993–95, 1998, 2001–02)

 Ellie Snyder
 Renee Props (1988–92)

 Emma Snyder
 Kathleen Widdoes (1985–2010)

 Ethan Snyder
 Brayden and Declan Schenck (2006–09)
 Jason Bastelli (2009–10)

 Faith Snyder
 Keara Dolan (1998–2002)
 Eliza Ryan (1998–2002)
 Cassidy Hinkle (2002–06)
 Ashley Marie Greiner (2006–09)
 Valentina de Angelis (2010)

 Holden Snyder
 Jon Hensley (1985–88; 1990–95, 1997–2010)

 Iva Snyder
 Lisa Brown (1985–94, 1998, 2000–01, 2003)
 Lisa Robbins (1992; temporary)

 Jack Snyder
 Michael Park (1997–2010)

 Carly Snyder
 Maura West (1995–2010)

 Jacob Snyder
 Unknown babies (2009–10)

 Joseph James "J.J." Snyder
 Dylan Denton (2004–06)
 Daniel Manche (2006–08)

 Josh Snyder/ Rod Landry
 William Fichtner (1987–89, 1992–94)

 Julie Snyder
 Susan Marie Snyder (1989–95, 1998)

 Lily Snyder
 Lucy Deakins (1984–85)
 Martha Byrne (1985–89, 1993–2008)
 Heather Rattray (1989–93)
 Noelle Beck (2008–10)

 Luke Snyder
 Spencer Goodnow (1995–96)
 Sean Cohan (1996)
 Jeremy Ian Zelig (1996–2001)
 Christopher Tavani (2001–05)
 Jake Weary (2005)
 Van Hansis (2005–10)

 Meg Snyder
 Jennifer Ashe (1986–89, 1994)
 Marie Wilson (2005–10)

 Natalie Snyder
 Milena Testa (2004–05)
 Ellery Capshaw (2006–08)
 Isabella Palmieri (2009–10)

 Sage Snyder
 Camryn Rose DeRoche (2003)
 Bianca Pagona (2004)
 Colleen Feehan (2004–05)
 Elle Sauli (2006)
 Allie Gorenc (2006–10)

 Seth Snyder
 Steve Bassett (1986–88, 1991–94, 2001, 2009)

 Charley Spangler
 James McCaffrey (2003)

 Beau Spencer
 Wayne Hudgins (1977–79)

 Jane Spencer
 Georgann Johnson (1977–79)

 Gunnar St. Clair
 Hugo Napier (1982–84)

 Jay Stallings
 Dennis Cooney (1973–80)
 Shawn Campbell (1974)

 David Stenbeck
 Chris Browning (1997)
 Daniel Markel (1997–98)
 Keith Coulouris (1998–2000)

 James Stenbeck
 Anthony Herrera (1980–83, 1986–89, 1996–99, 2001–05, 2008–10)

 Blake Stevens
 Peter Francis James (1989–91)

 Alison Stewart
 Amy Princine (1994–2000)
 Sarah Hyland (2001)
 Jessica Dunphy (2002–05)
 Marnie Schulenburg (2007–10)

 Betsy Stewart
 Tiberia Mitri (1970)
 Maurine Trainer (1970)
 Patricia McGuiness (1971)
 Suzanne Davidson (1972–80)
 Lisa Denton (1981–82)
 Meg Ryan (1982–84)
 Mary Kae (1984)
 Lindsay Frost (1984–88)
 Tracy Sallows (1991)
 Jordan Baker (1994)
 Jennifer Van Dyck (1996, voice))

 Betty Jackson Stewart
 Patricia Benoit (1960–62)

 Carol Ann "Annie" Stewart
 Jean Mazza (1969–70)
 Barbara Jean Ehrhardt (1970–71)
 Ariane Munker (1972–73)
 Shelly Spurlock (1973–74)
 Martina Deignan (1976–79)
 Julie Ridley (1979–82)
 Randall Edwards (1982)
 Mary Lynn Blanks (1982–86, 1991)

 Daniel "Dan" Stewart
 Paul O'Keefe (1962–63)
 Doug Chapin (1964)
 Jeffrey Rowland (1965)
 John Colenback (1966–73, 1976–79)
 John Reilly (1974–76)

 David Stewart
 Ernest Graves (1960)
 Henderson Forsythe (1960–90)

 Dawn "Dee" Stewart
 Simone Schachter (1971)
 Jean Mazza (1972–73)
 Glynnis O'Connor (1973)
 Marcia McClain (1976–78)
 Jacqueline Schultz (1979–82, 1985–86)
 Heather Cunningham (1980, temporary)
 Vicky Dawson (1982–83, 1991)

 Ellen Lowell Cole Stewart
 Wendy Drew (1956–60)
 Patricia Bruder (1960–95, 1998)

 Susan Stewart
 Connie Scott (1966–67)
 Diana Walker (1967)
 Jada Rowland (1967–68)
 Leslie Perkins (1968)
 Marie Masters (1968–79, 1986–2010)
 Judith Barcroft (1978, temporary)

 Emily Stewart
 Janine Sagan (1970s)
 Pat Reynolds (mid-1970s)
 Jenny Harris (1975–79)
 Marissa Morell (1979)
 Colleen McDermott (1986–87)
 Melanie Smith (1987–91)
 Kelley Menighan Hensley (1992–2010)

 Cal Stricklyn
 Patrick Tovatt (1988–98, 2001)

 Jennifer Sullivan
 Geraldine Court (1971–72)
 Gillian Spencer (1972–75, 1997)

 Dr. Al Suker
 Michael Ingram (1964–66)

 Helene Suker
 Jerrianne Raphael (1964)

 Martha Suker
 Ann Hegira (1964)

T
 Elizabeth "Liz" Talbot Stewart
 Jane House (1969–72)
 Judith McGilligan (1972–73)

 Marsha Talbot
 Giulia Pagano (1986–87)

 Ronnie Talbot
 Curt Dawson (1973)

 Brandy Taylor
 Virginia Williams (2001–02)
 
 Jade Taylor
 Elena Goode (2006–07)
 Davida Williams (2008–09)

 Tea
 Deborah Yates (2006–07)

 David Thatcher
 Lewis Arlt (1983–84)
 
 Kevin Thompson
 Michael Nader (1976–78)
 Max Brown (1978)
 John Cunningham (1978)

 Sarah Travers
 Joanna HartsHorne (2003–04)

 T. Marshall Travers
 Lamman Rucker (2002–03)

 Natalie Triandos
 Janet Zarish (1981)

 Beverly Tucker
 Christine Baranski (1983)

 Georgia Tucker
 Jaime Nicole Dudney (1998–2000)

 Marcus Tull
 Bruce MacVittie (2007)

 Janice Turner
 Joyce Van Patten (1956–57)
 Virginia Dwyer (1962)

 Jerry Turner
 James Earl Jones (1966)
 Doctor.

 Thelma Turner
 Leona Powers (1956–57)

 Malcolm Twist
 John Bolton (1996)

 Miss Tyler
 Betty Garde (1957–59)

V
 Nicole Van Doren
 Madga Wawrzyniak (1991)

 Ella Vanderberg
 Annie Heise (2009)

 Gregory Varner
 Mark Kevin Lewis (1993–94)

 Dahlia Farrarr Ventura
 Colleen Dion (2001–02)

 Maurice Vermeil
 David McCallum (1983)

 Mark Vero
 Lannon Killea (2008–09)

 Angela Visconti
 Liliana Komorowska (1988)

 Franco Visconti
 Ronald Guttman (1988)
 Lee Godart (1990)

 Gordon Voss
 Adam Grupper (2007)
 Doctor.

W
 Neil Wade
 Michael Lipton (1962–67)

 Pamela Wagner
 Robin Morse (1987–89)

 Tristan Wagner
Will Blagrove (2009)

 Justin Walker 
Charles Borland (2005)

 Alec Wallace
 Michael Woods (1999)

 Connor Walsh
 Allyson Rice-Taylor (1990–97)
 Susan Batten (1997)

 Evan Walsh III
 Greg Watkins (1991–95)
 Trent Bushey (1995; temporary)

 Evan Walsh IV
 Ryan Serhant (2007–08)

 Lily Walsh
 Lucy Deakins (1984–85)
 Martha Byrne (1985–89, 1993–2008)
 Heather Rattray (1989–93)
 Noelle Beck (2008–10)

 Lucinda Walsh
 Elizabeth Hubbard (1984–2010)
 Jessica Platell (1993; flashbacks)
 Kate Anthony (1996; flashbacks)

 Jeff Ward
 Robert Lipton (1978–84; 1985; 1986)

 Clark Watson
 Gregory Michael (2003–04)

 Rose Welinski
 Lilia Skala (1985)

 Sparky Wells
 Ray Aranha (1995–97)

 Pete Wendell
 Jason Biggs (1994–95)

 Don West
 John Spencer (1988)

 Brian Wheatley
 Laurence Lau (2008–09)

 Dawn Wheeler
 Alexandra Neil (1993–95)

 Jeremy Wheeler
 John Dauer (1995–96)

 Alice Whipple
 Leslie Charleson (1966)

 Silas Whitman
 Christopher Durham (2009)
 Congressman.

 Stefan Wilder
 James Burge (1976)

 Abigail Williams
 Emmy Rossum (1997)
 Kristina Sisco (1999–2002; 2010)

 Greta Williams
 Anne Bobby (2004)
 Social worker

 Cassandra Willis
 Elaina Erika Davis (2006–07)

 Carl Wilson
 Martin Rudy (1966–71)

 Connie Wilson
 Debbie McLeod (1981)

 Martha Wilson
 Anna Minot (1966–70)

 Sandy Wilson
 Dagne Crane (1966–71)
 Jill Andre (1968)
 Ronnie Carroll (1975)
 Barbara Rucker (1975–79)

 Stan Winchell 
 Estes Tarver (2009)

 Edna Winklemeyer
 Debra Jo Rupp (2008)

 Cass Winthrop
 Stephen Schnetzer (1999–2002; 2005; 2006)

 Mackenzie Wong
 Alice Lee (2009)

 Sandra Wong
 Linda Wang (1997–99)
 Registered nurse.

X

Y
 Kano Yamamoto
 James Saito (2006)

 Mori Yamamoto
 Mariko Takai (2006)

 Sam Yee
 Aki Aleong (1981)
 Doctor.

References

External links
 Who's Who in Oakdale on As the World Turns- SoapCentral.com

 
As the World Turns
As The World Turns